László Tahi Tóth (23 January 1944 – 22 February 2018) was a Kossuth Prize-awarded Hungarian stage, television and film actor. He was a member of the Vígszínház.

Personal life and death
Tahi Tóth was one of seven sons born to Eleanor Pfeiffer and Nándor Tahi Tóth. Two of Tahi Tóth's brothers were also actors.

Szilvia Kárászy, a pianist, married Tahi Tóth in 1995.

Tahi Tóth died in Budapest, Hungary on 22 February 2018 of a stroke, at the age of 74.

Selected filmography
 Red Letter Days (1967)
 Three Nights of Love (1967)
 Stars of Eger (1968)
 Imposztorok (1969)
 Kakuk Marci (1973)
 Time Masters (1982)
 Völegény (1982)
 The Red Countess (1985)

References

External links

Official Hungarian website

1944 births
2018 deaths
Hungarian male film actors
Hungarian male stage actors
Hungarian male television actors
Male actors from Budapest
20th-century Hungarian male actors